Jan Novak may refer to:

Entertainment
 Jan Novák (composer) (1921–1984), Czech composer of classical music 
 Jan Novák (writer) (born 1953), Czech writer and playwright
 Jan Nowak-Jeziorański (1914–2005), Polish writer and activist

Sports
 Jan Novák (handballer) (born 1960), Czech handball player
 Jan Novák (ice hockey) (born 1979), Czech professional ice hockey player
 Ján Novák (footballer) (born 1985), Slovak association football striker
 Jan Novák (footballer, born 1896) (1896–1968), Czech footballer
 Jan Novak (footballer, born 1997), Slovenian footballer

Others
 Jan Novak is a placeholder name used in Czech language